= Abu Reyan al-Zarkazi =

Al-Qaeda member

Abu Reyan al-Zarkazi, also known as Abu Musa, is suspected of being an al-Qaeda operative by the Pakistani government. On February 18, 2010 Pakistan announced it had captured Zarkazi and two other al-Qaeda suspects in Karachi. The Pakistani newspaper Dawn describes Zarkazi as a "known associate of Osama bin Laden."
